The Conniver Stakes is an American Thoroughbred horse race held annually in March at Laurel Park Racecourse in Laurel, Maryland. It is open to fillies and mares three years old and up and is run at seven furlongs on the dirt. An ungraded stakes race, it offers a purse of $100,000.

The race was named in honor of Conniver, the Maryland-bred that was named the nation's top handicap mare in 1948 during a season that included wins in the Brooklyn Handicap and Vagrancy Handicap (defeating Gallorette as well as Stymie). She also won the Beldame Stakes, the Comely Stakes and the Vagrancy Handicap. She was the brown daughter of Discovery out of The Schemer out of Challenger II and was bred by Alfred G. Vanderbilt II. She was owned by Harry LaMontagne, who purchased Conniver as a yearling for $1,500. The gawky, 17-hand mare was undistinguished at ages 2 and 3 and was nearly sold as a polo pony prior to the 1948 season. When Conniver retired at age 5, she had earned $227,825 from 56 starts with 15 wins, 6 seconds and 6 thirds.

Records 

Speed record: 
 7 furlongs - 1:23.00 - Winter Leaf   (2002) 
  miles - 1:45.00 - Dear to All   (1970)
  miles - 1:49.00 - Stem the Tide   (1992)

Most wins by an horse:
 2 - Bold Affair (2012, 2013)

Most wins by an owner:
 2 - Stephen E. Quick   (2007, 2010)
 2 - Mike Zanella/Charles Reed (2012, 2013)

Most wins by a jockey:
 3 - Edgar Prado    (1999, 2002, 2008)
 3 - Vincent Bracciale, Jr.    (1999, 2002, 2008)

Most wins by a trainer:
 3 - Richard W. Small   (1994, 2000, 2011)

Winners of the Conniver Stakes since 1969

See also 
 Conniver Stakes top three finishers

References

External links
 Laurel Park website

1969 establishments in Maryland
Laurel Park Racecourse
Horse races in Maryland
Recurring sporting events established in 1969